The World Without US is a 2008 documentary film created by Mitch Anderson and Jason J. Tomaric. Released in 2008, the documentary explores what might happen if the United States were to leave the international arena, rescind its global reach and become an isolationist nation for the first time since the early 20th century.
The film is available for viewing on the video-sharing website YouTube.

Subject matter
Anderson and Tomaric began the documentary in order to answer what would happen if the United States removed itself from foreign affairs by embarking on a quest to several regions of the world. In the regions, the filmmakers interview experts and ordinary world citizens to understand not only how the United States is viewed but also how the United States has affected the world outside of its borders. The film was officially selected for the GI Film Festival in Washington, D.C., in May 2008. The documentary covers a wide span of foreign affairs, not just the issues currently occurring in the Middle East and Asia.

Interviewees
Niall Ferguson, PhD.
James Lilley 
Saad Al-Ajmi, PhD.
Cheol-Hwan Khang
Hideyoshi Kase, PhD.
Legislator Bi-Khim Hsiao 
General Jovan Divjak
Miljenko Dereta

Actors
Roy Werner
Tomo Kawaguchi
Mark Ofuji
Mari Ueda

References

External links
 

2008 films
American documentary films
Documentary films about American politics
American independent films
2000s English-language films
2000s American films